Morgan Hikaru Aiken 加藤 ひかる (born July 15, 1994) is a former Japanese-American professional basketball player from Guam in the B.League.

Aiken is the first player from Guam to play in the professional Japan Basketball League. Born in Hawaii, he attended high school in Guam, and played NCAA college basketball for Eastern University. Transferred to the University of Texas at El Paso the following year for an opportunity to walk on. However, was ineligible due to lack of credits. Aiken is a part of the Guam national basketball team winning the gold medal at the 2014 Micronesian Games. Also was sponsored by BoingVert and Adidas Japan after gaining popularity on Instagram and YouTube from posting dunking videos at 5'7.

High school
Aiken was the only sophomore in 2010 to make the All-Island team (second team) in the Guam IIAAG High School League. In 2011 as a Junior, Aiken won the State Championship, was honored First Team All-Island, and also came in 2nd in the Slam Dunk Contest held at the Far East Tournament in Japan. 
Although projected to be the MVP of the league after his outstanding junior year, Aiken fractured his left foot 2 weeks prior to the start of his senior season. Playing only half the season, he still managed to be named to the Second Team All-Island. In 2012, Aiken graduated from Saint Paul Christian School. Following his graduation, he committed to Eastern University in Pennsylvania.

Professional career
In 2015, Aiken signed a contract with the Akita Northern Happinets thru an early entry process and had begun practicing with the team. However, with complications with the process, he signed with the Tokyo Cinq Rêves for the remainder of the season. The following season, Aiken signed with the Kagawa Five Arrows. Now, Aiken is currently taking time off to focus more on his younger brother, Reo Aiken, back in Guam. Morgan hopes that Reo can be the next face of basketball on Guam.

Notes
 First Guam high school graduate to sign pro contract (October 2015).
 Youngest Guam high school graduate to sign pro contract (Age: 21).
 Known as "thehumanplane" from his social media.
 Running vertical jump of +40 inches.
 Has a younger-older brother who is both taller and more explosive than him.

References

External links
 Chasing a dream
 Five Arrows Page Official Team Homepage
 GSPN Interview Summer 2016
 Sign Pro First Year PostGuam.com 2016
 South Carolina News, First Year Pro 
 Guam National Team Micro Games 2014 
 RealGM – Morgan Aiken
 EU Roster Eastern University Official Roster 2013
 Micronesian Games Gold Captured Veteran Jino Han captured 6 in Micro Games
 Guam Basketball
 Guam Team Updates
 Far East 2012 All Tourney Team
 Saint Paul CS

Guamanian men's basketball players
Point guards
1994 births
Eastern University (United States) alumni
Kagawa Five Arrows players
People from Hawaii
Saitama Broncos players
Tokyo Cinq Rêves players
Living people
American men's basketball players
Yamaguchi Patriots players